Dark Days, White Nights is the fourth studio album of the Italy-based musician, Tying Tiffany.

Track listing
 "New Colony" - 4:17
 "Dark Day" - 3:17
 "Drownin'" - 3:25
 "Sinistral" - 4:09
 "She Never Dies" - 3:06
 "Universe" - 3:31
 "Unleashed" - 4:18
 "5 AM" - 3:13
 "Lepers of the Sun" - 3:36
 "White Night" - 4:38

References

Tying Tiffany albums
2012 albums